Cardinal Gibbons High School, commonly known as Gibbons, is a private, Roman Catholic college-preparatory school in Fort Lauderdale, Florida. CGHS was established in 1961 and was named after James Gibbons, the second Cardinal in the United States. CGHS is sponsored by the Roman Catholic Archdiocese of Miami.

History
Cardinal Gibbons was established in September 1961, by Coleman F. Carroll, who appointed Thomas A. Dennehy the first supervising principal, Marie Schramko, principal of the Girls' Division and Henry Mirowski, principal of the Boys' Division. CGHS opened its doors to 176 freshmen and sophomores on a campus with two buildings. In the following years, the addition of the eleventh and twelfth grades, an enlarged faculty, a field house, science wing, cafeteria, gym, and new classrooms led to the current ten buildings. The 18-acre campus currently contains those 10 academic buildings, an interactive Media and Technology Center, four state-of-the-art science labs and a chapel that seats 300, in addition to a baseball and football field. 

In 1972, the school became co-educational. On June 17, 1973, Joseph Huck was appointed to succeed Dennehy as supervising principal. From September 1974 to December 2002, Joseph J. Kershner served as supervising principal. Upon Kershner's retirement December 2, 2002, Paul D. Ott was appointed interim principal. His appointment as principal became effective July 1, 2003.

In 2019, Paul D. Ott served his last year as principal, being replaced by Oscar Cedeño, the former dean of students, in the 2019-2020 school year. In 2021, a new academic wing was added to the school for fine arts and STEM activities, totaling 10 buildings.

Crest 
In the upper right-hand corner is the crest of the Archdiocese of Miami, a palm tree planted between two crosses. The flowing waters surrounding the base of the crest signify the State of Florida. In the upper left-hand corner is the coat of arms of James Cardinal Gibbons with the words, “Emitte Spiritum Tuum,” meaning "Send forth thy Spirit." In 1886 Gibbons was elevated to Cardinal Archbishop of Baltimore, becoming the second American to attain that rank in the Catholic Church.

The bottom half of the crest is reserved for the shields of the two religious communities who have taught at Cardinal Gibbons. The one to the left is the Franciscan emblem, the stigmata of Saint Francis extended over the hand of Christ. The one to the right is the Piarist emblem. On the Piarist shield is Mary, the Mother of God, in Greek lettering. Her crown above the Latin "Maria" symbolizes her endless reign over the Order and her inspirational guidance over schools.

Stretching across the bottom of the Crest is the Latin word "Excelsior," the school motto, encouraging the students "ever onward.”

Notable alumni

Donnell Bennett, Former NFL player (Kansas City Chiefs, Washington Redskins)
Christian Blake, NFL player
Jason Bostic, Former NFL player (Philadelphia Eagles, Buffalo Bills)
Josh Fogg, Former MLB player (Chicago White Sox, Pittsburgh Pirates, Colorado Rockies, Cincinnati Reds)
Taurean Green, Professional basketball
Tron LaFavor, Former NFL player (Chicago Bears). Transferred after his junior season.
Ryan Shealy, Former MLB player (Colorado Rockies, Kansas City Royals, Boston Red Sox)
Blair Walsh, NFL Kicker, Free Agent
R. J. McIntosh, NFL defensive end, New York Giants
Ryan Hunter-Reay, IndyCar Driver

Notes and references

Catholic secondary schools in Florida
Educational institutions established in 1961
Private high schools in Broward County, Florida
High schools in Fort Lauderdale, Florida
1961 establishments in Florida